Michael Roe (born 1954) is an American musician.

Michael Roe may also refer to:
Michael Roe (historian) (born 1931), Australian historian and academic
Michael Roe (racing driver) (born 1955), Irish former racing driver
Michael Roe (badminton) (born 1995), English badminton player

See also
Michael Roes (born 1960), German writer
Michael Rowe (disambiguation)